The Visual Effects Society Award for Outstanding Visual Effects in a Photoreal Episode is one of the annual awards given by the Visual Effects Society starting in 2002. While the award's title has changed several time within this period, the recipient has always been a visual effects-heavy television episode. Episodes with more background effects work have their own category, the Outstanding Supporting Visual Effects in a Photoreal Episode. Until 2012, miniseries and television movies had their own category.

Winners and nominees

2000s
Best Visual Effects in a Television Series

Best Visual Effects in a Broadcast Series

Best Visual Effects in a Television Miniseries, Movie, or Special

Outstanding Visual Effects in a Broadcast Miniseries, Movie, or Special

{| class="wikitable" style="width:100%"
|- bgcolor="#bebebe"
! width="5%" | Year
! width="30%" | Program
! width="25%" | Episode(s)
! width="33%" | Nominees
! width="8%" | Network
|-
| rowspan="4" style="text-align:center;"| 2008 || style="background:#B0C4DE;" | John Adams || style="background:#B0C4DE;"| "Join or Die" || style="background:#B0C4DE;"| Steve Kullback, Eric Henry, Robert Stromberg, Jeff Goldman || style="background:#B0C4DE;"| HBO
|-
| colspan="2"| Doctor Who: The Next Doctor (Cyber King) || Dave Houghton, Marie Jones, Matt McKinney, Murray Barber || BBC One
|-
| Generation Kill || "The Cradle of Civilization" || Adam McInnes, Anthony Bluff, Stephane Paris, David Sewell || HBO
|-
| colspan="2"| Knight Rider (Prometheus) || Sam Nicholson, Scott Ramsey, Chris Martin, Mike Enriquez || NBC 
|-
| rowspan="5" style="text-align:center;"| 2009 || style="background:#B0C4DE;" colspan="2"| Prep & Landing (Gadgets, Gloves and other Garish Gizmos) || style="background:#B0C4DE;"| Dorothy McKim, Scott Kersavage, David Hutchins, Kee Suong || style="background:#B0C4DE;"| ABC|-
| Alice || "Night 2" ||  Lee Wilson, Lisa Sepp-Wilson, Sebastien Bergeron, Les Quinn || Syfy
|-
| colspan="2"| Ben 10: Alien Swarm (Montage) || Evan Jacobs, Sean McPherson, Andrew Orloff || Cartoon Network 
|-
| colspan="2"| Infestation || PJ Foley, Efram Potelle, James May, Dan DeEnremont || Syfy 
|-
| colspan="2"| Skellig || Sara Bennett, Jenna Powell, David Houghton, Jean-Claude Deguara || Sky One
|}

2010sOutstanding Visual Effects in a Broadcast SeriesOutstanding Visual Effects in a Broadcast Miniseries, Movie or SpecialOutstanding Visual Effects in a Broadcast ProgramOutstanding Visual Effects in a Visual Effects-Driven Photoreal/Live Action Broadcast ProgramOutstanding Visual Effects in a Photoreal Episode2020s
{| class="wikitable" style="width:100%"
|- bgcolor="#bebebe"
! width="5%" | Year
! width="30%" | Program
! width="25%" | Episode(s)
! width="33%" | Nominees
! width="8%" | Network
|-
| rowspan="5" style="text-align:center;" | 2020 || style="background:#B0C4DE;" |The Mandalorian || style="background:#B0C4DE;" |"Chapter 9: The Marshal" || style="background:#B0C4DE;" |Joe Bauer, Abbigail Keller, Hal Hickel, Richard Bluff, Roy Cancino || style="background:#B0C4DE;" |Disney+
|-
| Lovecraft Country || "Jig-a-Bobo" || Kevin Blank, Robin Griffin, Pietro Ponti, Francois Dumoulin || HBO
|-
| Star Trek: Discovery || "Su’Kal" || Jason Michael Zimmerman, Aleksandra Kochoska, Ante Dekovic, Ivan Kondrup Jensen || CBS All Access
|-
| colspan="2"| Timmy Failure: Mistakes Were Made || Rich McBride, Leslie Lerman, Nicolas Chevallier, Anders Beer, Tony Lazarowich || Disney+
|-
| Westworld || "Crisis Theory" || Jay Worth, Elizabeth Castro, Bruce Branit, Joe Wehmeyer, Mark Byers || HBO
|-
| rowspan="5" style="text-align:center;" | 2021 
|  style="background:#B0C4DE;" |Foundation ||  style="background:#B0C4DE;" |"The Emperor's Peace" || style="background:#B0C4DE;" |Chris MacLean, Addie Manis, Mike Enriquez, Chris Keller, Paul Byrne || style="background:#B0C4DE;" |Apple TV+
|-
| Loki || "Journey Into Mystery" || Dan DeLeeuw, Allison Paul, Sandra Balej, David Seager || Disney+
|-
| Lost in Space || "Trust" || Jabbar Raisani, Terron Pratt, Juri Stanossek, Niklas Jacobson, Paul Benjamin || Netflix
|-
| The Nevers || "Ignition" || Johnny Han, Jack Geist, Justin Mitchell, Emanuel Fuchs, Michael Dawson || HBO
|-
| colspan="2"|The Stand || Jake Braver, Phillip Hoffman, Laurent Hugueniot, Vincent Papaix || CBS All Access
|-
| rowspan="5" style="text-align:center;" | 2022 
|  style="background:#B0C4DE;" |The Lord of the Rings: The Rings of Power' ||  style="background:#B0C4DE;" |"Udûn" || style="background:#B0C4DE;" |Jason Smith, Ron Ames, Nigel Sumner, Tom Proctor, Dean Clarke || style="background:#B0C4DE;" |Amazon
|-
| The Boys || "Payback" || Stephan Fleet, Shalena Oxley-Butler, Tristan Zerafa, Anthony Paterson, Hudson Kenny || Amazon
|-
| House of the Dragon || "The Black Queen" || Angus Bickerton, Nikeah Forde, Sven Martin, Michael Bell, Michael Dawson || HBO
|-
| Prehistoric Planet || "Ice Worlds" || Lindsay McFarlane, Fay Hancocks, Elliot Newman, Kristin Hall || Apple TV+
|-
| Stranger Things 4 || "The Piggyback" || Jabbar Raisani, Terron Pratt, Niklas Jacobson, Justin Mitchell, Richard E. Perry || Netflix
|}

Programs with multiple awards

6 awards
 Game of Thrones (HBO)

4 awards
 Battlestar Galactica (Syfy)
|}

Programs with multiple nominations

7 nominations
 Game of Thrones (HBO)

5 nominations
 Battlestar Galactica (Syfy)

3 nominations
 Agents of S.H.I.E.L.D. (ABC)
 Doctor Who (BBC)
 Stranger Things (Netflix)
 Westworld (HBO)

2 nominations
 Falling Skies (TNT)
 Fringe (Fox)
 Heroes (NBC)
 Lost in Space (Netflix)
 The Mandalorian (Disney+)
 Once Upon a Time (ABC)
 Smallville (The WB)
 Stargate Atlantis (Syfy)
 Stargate Universe(Syfy)
 Star Trek: Discovery (CBS All Access)
 Star Trek: Enterprise (UPN)
 V'' (ABC)

References

Visual Effects Society Awards
Awards established in 2002